Spring Showers, the Coach is a black and white photograph taken by Alfred Stieglitz in 1899–1900. The picture was published in the Camera Notes journal in January 1902. Sometimes it is incorrectly presented as being taken in 1902.

History and description
Stieglitz started taking a series of nocturnal views of New York, in 1897. The following year he took a new photographic series at Madison Square on a rain. The picture depicts a typical urban scene of the time, with a carriage riding through heavy rain, in a street ornamented with trees to their left. It is one of the best examples of Stieglitz pictorialist phase, where he tried to emulate the delicate tonal style of the American painter James McNeill Whistler by taking it under rain and snow. There are also some influence of the Japanese art then at vogue in the western world.

Carolyn Burke states that this photograph, similarly to others in the same series, "blends urban and pastoral elements in compositions that show an affinity with the Arts and Crafts aesthetics." According to Burke the current photograph, like the companion piece, Spring Sowers - The Street Cleaner "share the linearity that would distinguish Stieglitz's photograph of the Flatiron building, on the south side of the square."

Public collections
There are prints of this photograph at the Metropolitan Museum of Art, New York, and at The Minneapolis Institute of Arts.

References

1899 works
1900 works
1899 in art
1900 in art
Black-and-white photographs
1890s photographs
1900s photographs
Photographs by Alfred Stieglitz
Photographs of the Metropolitan Museum of Art